NoCGV Harstad is a purpose-built offshore patrol vessel for the Norwegian Coast Guard. She is named after the city Harstad in Northern Norway. As of May 2018, the commanding officer is Lt. Cmdr. Kyrre Einarsen.

Harstad was built as a multipurpose vessel, but optimised for emergency towing of large oil tankers (up to ), oil spill clean-up and fire fighting. The most common duty will be fishery inspection and search and rescue in Norway's large exclusive economic zone. The steadily increasing traffic of large oil tankers along the Norwegian coast explains the need for this type of vessel.

The vessel is built of high-end design.
Designer is Rolls-Royce Marine AS, Dept. Ship Technology - Offshore
Type: UT 512

See also 
 ICGV Þór (2009)
 Barentshav class OPV

References

External links 
Rolls-Royce article about KV Harstad
Article from Offshore Shipping Online
Armed Forces: KV Harstad fire fighting 
Article from the Norwegian Armed Forces with specifications 
MarineTraffic

Patrol vessels of the Norwegian Coast Guard
2005 ships
Ships built in Romania